Damien Beaumont is a broadcaster and musician. He is most notable for his work as a broadcaster on Australian Broadcasting Corporation radio station ABC Classic FM.

Career 
Beaumont graduated from the Elder Conservatorium of Music in Adelaide, where he studied music. He continued his training as an operatic baritone in England, returned to Australia in 1999 to join the Australian Broadcasting Corporation.

Beaumont now works as a presenter at ABC Classic FM where he presents "Evenings".

References 

ABC radio (Australia) journalists and presenters
Classical music radio presenters
Living people
Year of birth missing (living people)
Place of birth missing (living people)